Kentro Neotitas Kalou Choriou "Commandaria" was a Cypriot association football club based in Kalo Chorio, Limassol, located in the Limassol District. It had 2 participations in Cypriot Fourth Division. On 1998 merged with Th.O.I. Agios Georgios Kalou Choriou to form PAOK Kalou Choriou.

References

Football clubs in Cyprus
Association football clubs established in 1979
1979 establishments in Cyprus
Association football clubs disestablished in 1998